Vermont has been represented in the United States House of Representatives by a single at-large congressional district since the 1930 census, when the state lost its second seat, obsoleting its 1st and 2nd congressional districts. There were once six districts in Vermont, all of which were eliminated after various censuses.

Bernie Sanders (Independent) held the seat from 1991 until 2007, when he became a U.S. senator. Democrat Peter Welch, who succeeded Sanders in 2007, represented the state until 2023, when he was elected to succeed Patrick Leahy in the Senate. Progressive Democrat Becca Balint was elected to succeed Welch in the House for the 118th Congress. Balint is the first woman and LGBT person to represent Vermont, making Vermont the last state to be represented in Congress by a woman.

List of representatives 
Vermont has elected its representatives at-large from 1813 to 1821, beginning with the 13th Congress; 1823 to 1825, with the 18th Congress; and from 1933 to the present, beginning with the 73rd Congress, after being reduced to one representative as a result of the 1930 Census. In all other years, Vermont elected its representatives from separate districts.

All members were elected statewide at-large on a general ticket.

1933–present: 1 seat 
After the 1930 United States Census, Vermont was reduced to one seat, which it has used ever since.

Electoral history

1990
Independent Bernie Sanders defeated incumbent Republican Peter Plympton Smith.

1992
Incumbent Bernie Sanders ran for and won re-election.

1994
Incumbent Bernie Sanders ran for and won re-election.

1996
Incumbent Bernie Sanders ran for and won re-election.

1998
Incumbent Bernie Sanders ran for and won re-election.

2000
Incumbent Bernie Sanders ran for and won re-election.

2002
Incumbent Bernie Sanders ran for and won re-election.

2004

Incumbent Bernie Sanders ran for and won re-election.

2006

Incumbent Bernie Sanders retired to successfully run for a U.S. Senate seat.

Vermont Senate President Pro Tempore Peter Welch (D-Windsor County) was the Democratic nominee and the eventual winner.

Three candidates competed for the Republican nomination:
Major General Martha Rainville, USANG (ret) (R), former Adjutant General of the Vermont National Guard.
Vermont State senator Mark Shepard (R-Bennington County).
Republican businessman Dennis Morrisseau, who promised to bring articles of impeachment against President George W. Bush.

Rainville won the Republican primary on September 12, beating Shepard by a wide margin.

There were also numerous third party and independent candidates: Chris Karr (WTP), Bruce Marshall (Green Party), Dennis Morrisseau (Ind), Jane Newton (Liberty Union Party), Keith Stern (Ind), and Jerry Trudell (Ind). Morrisseau gathered the most votes, with 1% or 1,383 votes.

By September 14, 2006, the race between Rainville and Welch was close.  An American Research Group poll showed Welch with a 48–45% lead.

On October 4, 2006, The Burlington Free Press reported that one of Rainville's staffers, Christopher Stewart, resigned from her campaign after committing plagiarism—copying policy statements from other politicians, including senator Hillary Clinton, and using them on Rainville's website. Rainville's website was off-line for some time while her staff removed the plagiarized passages.

Welch beat Rainville 53% to 45%, or 139,585 votes to 117,211.

2008

2010

2012

2014

2016

2018

2020

2022

Sources
 Office of the Clerk: Election Statistics since 1920

 Congressional Biographical Directory of the United States 1774–present

Notes

References

At-large
At-large United States congressional districts